Looneyville is an unincorporated community in Nacogdoches County, Texas, in the United States.

History
Looneyville was named in the 1870s for John Looney, who kept a store at the site. It has frequently been noted on lists of unusual place names.

References

Unincorporated communities in Nacogdoches County, Texas
Unincorporated communities in Texas